The Portola Institute was a "nonprofit educational foundation" founded in Menlo Park, California in 1966  by  Dick Raymond. The Portola institute helped to develop other organizations such as The Briarpatch Society and Bob Albrecht's People's Computer Company. It was also the publisher of Stewart Brand's Whole Earth Catalog beginning with the first issue in 1968. The first issue of The Whole Earth Catalog notes that the catalog is one division of The Portola Institute and that other activities of the Institute include: "computer education for all grade levels, simulation games for classroom use, new approaches to music education, Ortega Park Teachers Laboratory." Raymond and Brand later collaborated to form the Point Foundation.

Notes

References
Brand, Stewart. Whole Earth Catalog. Fall 1968.
 Turner, Fred 

Publishing companies of the United States
Whole Earth Catalog
Menlo Park, California
Organizations established in 1966
Publishing companies established in 1966
1966 establishments in California